"She's Everything" is a song co-written and recorded by American country music artist Brad Paisley.  It reached the top of the Billboard Hot Country Songs Chart. It was released in August 2006 as the fourth and final single from Paisley's album Time Well Wasted. It was Paisley's seventh number one single.  The song is featured on co-writer Wil Nance's self-named album as the number one track, published by Hillbilly Willy Songs, BMI.  It is one of Paisley's four songs certified 2× Platinum by the Recording Industry Association of America, the other being "Then", "Whiskey Lullaby", and "Remind Me". This marks Brad Paisley's first song to debut his usage of a Fender Stratocaster electric guitar even though he frequently uses Fender Telecaster as his main electric guitar.

Background and writing
The music and lyrics were written by Wil Nance, for his wife, Holly.  Brad re-wrote a small portion of the lyrics to personalize the song more closely to his own life.

Music video
The music video was directed by Scott Scovill, and features Brad Paisley on his tour.

Chart performance

Year-end charts

Certifications

References

2006 singles
2005 songs
Country ballads
2000s ballads
Brad Paisley songs
Songs written by Brad Paisley
Song recordings produced by Frank Rogers (record producer)
Arista Nashville singles